Pleuroceras is a genus of ammonite from the lower Jurassic, upper Pliensbachian.

Species
 Pleuroceras hawskerense (Young & Bird, 1828)
 Pleuroceras solare (Phillips, 1829)
 Pleuroceras spinatum (Bruguière, 1789)
 Pleuroceras transiens Frentzen, 1937
 Pleuroceras apyrenum Buckman, 1911

Description
Pleuroceras has a planulate shell with a quadrate whorl section, bearing strong radial ribs ending in ventro-lateral tubercles. The venter is tabulate with a strong serrated keel.

Distribution
Species of this genus were fast-moving nektonic carnivores. Its fossils have been found in Canada and Europe (Bulgaria, France, Germany, Hungary, Italy, Montenegro, Romania, Serbia, Spain and United Kingdom).

References

External links
 Encyclopedia of life

Ammonitida genera
Eoderoceratoidea
Ammonites of Europe
Jurassic ammonites
Ammonites of North America
Fossils of Serbia